In astronomy, a syzygy is a roughly straight-line configuration of three or more celestial bodies in a gravitational system.

Overview 
The word is often used in reference to the Sun, Earth, and either the Moon or a planet, where the latter is in conjunction or opposition. Solar and lunar eclipses occur at times of syzygy, as do transits and occultations. The term is
often applied when the Sun and Moon are in conjunction (new moon) or opposition (full moon).

The word syzygy is often used to describe interesting configurations of astronomical objects in general. For example, one such case occurred on March 21, 1894, around 23:00 GMT, when Mercury transited the Sun as would have been seen from Venus, and Mercury and Venus both simultaneously transited the Sun as seen from Saturn. It is also used to describe situations when all the planets are on the same side of the Sun although they are not necessarily in a straight line, such as on March 10, 1982.

On June 3, 2014, the Curiosity rover on Mars observed the planet Mercury transiting the Sun, marking the first time a planetary transit has been observed from a celestial body besides Earth.

Occultations, transits, and eclipses 

Syzygy sometimes results in an occultation, transit, or eclipse.

 An occultation occurs when an apparently larger body passes in front of an apparently smaller one. 
 A transit occurs when a smaller body passes in front of a larger one.
 In the combined case where the smaller body regularly transits the larger, an occultation is also termed a secondary eclipse.
 An eclipse occurs when a body totally or partially disappears from view, either by an occultation, as with a solar eclipse, or by passing into the shadow of another body, as with a lunar eclipse (thus both are listed on NASA's eclipse page).

Transits and occultations of the Sun by Earth's Moon are called solar eclipses regardless of whether the Sun is completely or partially covered. By extension, transits of the Sun by a satellite of a planet may also be called eclipses, as with the transits of Phobos and Deimos shown on NASA's JPL photojournal, as may the passage of a satellite into the planet's shadow, as with this eclipse of Phobos. The term eclipse is also used more generally for bodies passing in front of one another. For example, a NASA Astronomy Picture of the Day refers to the Moon eclipsing and occulting Saturn interchangeably.

Einstein ring 

As electromagnetic rays are somewhat bent by gravitation, when they pass by a heavy mass they are bent. Thus, the heavy mass acts as a form of gravitational lens. If the light source, the gravitating mass and the observer stand in a line, one sees what is termed an Einstein ring.

Tidal variation 

Syzygy causes the bimonthly phenomena of spring and neap tides. At the new and full moon, the Sun and Moon are in syzygy. Their tidal forces act to reinforce each other, and the ocean both rises higher and falls lower than the average. Conversely, at the first and third quarter, the Sun and Moon are at right angles, their tidal forces counteract each other, and the tidal range is smaller than average. Tidal variations can also be measured in the Earth's crust, and these tidal influences may affect the frequency of earthquakes.

References 

Astrometry
Eclipses
Astronomical events